Give Up the Ghost may refer to:

Give Up the Ghost (band), now American Nightmare, a hardcore punk band
Give Up the Ghost (album), by Brandi Carlile, 2009
"Give Up the Ghost", a song by Ariana and the Rose
"Give Up the Ghost", a song by C2C from Tetra
"Give Up the Ghost", a song by Immature from The Journey
"Give Up the Ghost", a song by Radiohead from The King of Limbs
"Give Up the Ghost", a song by Starsailor from Good Souls: The Greatest Hits
"Give Up the Ghost", a song by Switches from Heart Tuned to D.E.A.D.

See also
Giving Up the Ghost (disambiguation)